Vanocker Creek is a stream in the U.S. state of South Dakota.

Vanocker Creek has the name of Frank Vanocker, an early settler.

See also
List of rivers of South Dakota

References

Rivers of Meade County, South Dakota
Rivers of South Dakota